The Sabath Act was a Federal law that established an immigrant protection network.

Provisions

It was sponsored by Rep. Adolph J. Sabath (D) of Illinois. The act (passed in July, 1913) established Federal Bureaus at railroad junctures and stations to protect immigrants from local nativists and to aid newly arrived immigrants to the United States who were traveling cross-country to their final destinations. The government rented buildings near the stations and equipped them with reception rooms, baths, laundry, and beds.  After the immigration restrictions of the early 1920s, Congress failed to appropriate any further funds for the act and, while still on the books, it fell into disuse.

1913 in American law
United States federal legislation
History of immigration to the United States
United States immigration law